Avrămeni is a commune in Botoșani County, Western Moldavia, Romania. It is composed of seven villages: Aurel Vlaicu, Avrămeni, Dimitrie Cantemir, Ichimeni, Panaitoaia, Timuș and Tudor Vladimirescu.

References

Communes in Botoșani County
Localities in Western Moldavia